Monedas al aire is the first live album of Carlos Varela, released in 1993

Track listing
"Todos se roban" - 7:39
"Guillermo Tell" - 2:49
"Soy un Gnomo" - 4:10
"Memorias" - 4:22
"Tropicollage" - 6:18
"Jalisko Park" - 5:50
"Jaque Mate 1916" - 5:33
"Bulevar" - 4:15
"Cuchilla en la acera" - 4:54

Personnel
Carlos Varela - lead vocals
Dagoberto Pedraja - guitar
Yadam González - bass guitar
Elio Villafranca - keyboards, piano, sampler
José Mestre - keyboards
Fernando Favier - drums, percussion, sampler
Guillermo Trujillo - percussion, trumpet
Eduardo Pinto - tenor saxophone
Jorge Lopez - alto and soprano saxophone
Tania Gonzalez - backing vocals

References

External links

Carlos Varela Official site

1991 live albums
Carlos Varela albums